Pergamasellus is a genus of mites in the family Parasitidae.

Species
 Pergamasellus delicatus Evans, 1957

References

Parasitidae